Chelativorans multitrophicus is a Gram-negative, aerobic, non-motile bacteria from the genus of Chelativorans which was isolated from soil of activated sludge from industrial wastewater treatment plants in Switzerland . Chelativorans multitrophicus has the ability to degrade EDTA.

References

External links
Type strain of Chelativorans multitrophicus at BacDive -  the Bacterial Diversity Metadatabase

Phyllobacteriaceae
Bacteria described in 2010